Thomas Wilmington (born 1875, deceased) was an English professional footballer who played as a winger in the Football League for Blackburn Rovers.

References

1875 births
Year of death missing
People from Oswaldtwistle
English footballers
Association football outside forwards
Accrington Stanley F.C. (1891) players
Burnley F.C. players
Blackburn Rovers F.C. players
Nelson F.C. players
Southport F.C. players
English Football League players